Anya (Hindi title: Anya The Other) is an Indian bilingual (Marathi & Hindi) crime film written and directed by Simmy and produced by Initiative Films in association with Capitalwood Pictures. The film features Atul Kulkarni, Raima Sen, Bhushan Pradhan,Prathamesh Parab in lead roles.

Cast 
 Atul Kulkarni 
 Raima Sen 
 Bhushan Pradhan 
 Tejashree Pradhan 
 Prathamesh Parab 
 Krutika Deo
 Sunil Tawade 
 Govind Namdev 
 Deepak Pandey 
 Ushpal Sharma

Awards 
The film won two awards: Best Film at the Alvisbein Film Festival in Sweden, Best First Time Director and Best Picture at the Falcon International Film Festival (June 2021) in London.  The film has won accolades at the Global Indian International Film Festival and the Toronto Independent Festival.

Release 
Anya is scheduled to be theatrically release on 10 June 2022.

References

External links 
 

2022 films
2020s Marathi-language films